Mark Edward Mitchell (born September 15, 1965) was the Acting Assistant Secretary of Defense for Special Operations and Low-Intensity Conflict for the United States Department of Defense for several months during 2019. A retired colonel, Mitchell was the first member of the United States Army to be awarded the Distinguished Service Cross during the War in Afghanistan and was the first to receive the award since the Vietnam War. He received the award in 2003 for his actions during the Battle of Qala-i-Jangi, which took place in late November to early December 2001.

Early life, education and family
Mitchell's home of record is Brookfield, Wisconsin. He is an alumnus of Marquette University (1987), and graduated with a degree in biomedical engineering.  In 2012, he received Marquette University's Alumni Professional Achievement Award. In the late 1990s, Mitchell attended the Naval Postgraduate School, writing the thesis Strategic Leverage: Information Operations and Special Operations Forces. In the 2000s, Mitchell attended The John F. Kennedy School of Government and The United States Army War College. Mitchell is married, and has two daughters.

Military career
Mitchell began his career assigned to the 24th Infantry Division at Fort Stewart, Georgia. Having served during the Persian Gulf War, Mitchell was with the 5th Special Forces Group at the beginning of the Invasion of Afghanistan. Entering Afghanistan via helicopter, Mitchell and other members of his special forces group began to work with Abdul Rashid Dostum of the Northern Alliance, travelling on horse back. In late November 2001, Mitchell responded to Mazar-e-Sharif and led a fifteen-person special forces team, made up of British and Americans, to stop a prison uprising involving John Walker Lindh at Qala-i-Jangi; for his actions he was awarded the Distinguished Service Cross, and a Navy SEAL was awarded a Navy Cross. Mitchell was later involved in the capture of Mohammad Fazl. In 2003, he deployed to Iraq. Later that year he traveled to MacDill Air Force Base, where he received the Distinguished Service Cross for his actions leading the effort to quell the Taliban's offensive at the Battle of Qala-i-Jangi in 2001. CIA Director George Tenet, the widow of CIA officer Johnny Micheal Spann, and others attended the award ceremony.

From 2003 to 2009, Mitchell deployed to Iraq at least once a year. In 2005, he was promoted to lieutenant colonel. While in Iraq, Mitchell trained and mentored his Iraqi counterparts; however, he says that a year after the United States left Iraq, the capabilities he had taught the Iraqis had been "squandered". By the summer of 2007, Mitchell was the executive officer of 5th Special Forces Group and became its commanding officer at the rank of colonel in August 2009. By 2010, Mitchell was in command of Combined Joint Special Operations Task Force-Arabian Peninsula, with over four thousand American operators, who fought alongside Iraqi Special Operations Forces against the insurgency. At Fort Campbell Mitchell accepted steel from the World Trade Center on behalf of 5th Special Forces Group in 2011, and while in Afghanistan he was part of a mission to bury the steel there.  In 2012, Mitchell was assigned to the Office of the Secretary of Defense, specifically working with the Assistant Secretary of Defense for Special Operations/Low Intensity Conflict & Interdependent Capabilities. He was also interviewed on the radio program Someone You Should Know in 2012.

In 2014, Mitchell was a member of the Obama Administration's National Security Council as the director for counterrorism; he held that position until January 2015. While director, he was criticized for threatening families, including Kayla Mueller's, with criminal penalties for attempting to negotiate a ransom for the release of their children. When the Obama Administration relaxed the American policy against ransom payment in exchange for hostages in June 2015, Mitchell criticized the change.

Awards and decorations
Mitchell has received several awards, and other decorations including the following:

Distinguished Service Cross citation
His award citation reads:

Post military career
, Mitchell had retired and become a non-resident fellow at the Combating Terrorism Center. He has also written about irregular warfare in the Small Wars Journal.

Popular media
In 2009, Doug Stanton wrote the book Horse Soldiers, a third of which focuses on the actions of Mitchell. 12 Strong, a 2018 movie produced by Jerry Bruckheimer and starring Chris Hemsworth, Michael Shannon and Michael Peña, is based on Horse Soldiers.

References

United States Army personnel of the War in Afghanistan (2001–2021)
Harvard Kennedy School alumni
Living people
Marquette University alumni
Members of the United States Army Special Forces
Military personnel from Milwaukee
Naval Postgraduate School alumni
Recipients of the Distinguished Service Cross (United States)
United States Army colonels
United States Army War College alumni
United States National Security Council staffers
1965 births